The Preto River is a river of Amapá state in Brazil. It is a tributary of the Amazon River.

Rivers of Amapá
Tributaries of the Amazon River